The Asahi was made by Miyata Works Ltd, Tokyo, from 1937 to about 1939. It was a light car, powered by a 730 cc 2-cylinder engine that drove the front wheels. It had a two-seater body and independent suspension all around.

See also
Asahi (motorcycle)

References

Cars of Japan